Aaro Olavi Pajari (17 July 1897 – 14 October 1949) was a Major General in the Finnish Army. During World War II, he became one of the four double recipients of the Mannerheim Cross 2nd Class.

His greatest achievement was the Finnish victory at the Battle of Tolvajärvi in the Winter War, where his small Finnish force smashed a far larger Soviet army. Pajari went on to serve throughout the Winter, Continuation, and Lapland wars, becoming famous for his success in leading small unit, and guerrilla style operations.

Early life 
Aaro Pajari was born in 1897 to politician and teacher Olli Pajari and Maria Helena Laatunen. In 1917 he joined the White Guard and participated in the Finnish Civil War as a company commander. Pajari was wounded in the battles of Oulu and Heinola. After the  civil war Pajari remained in the military and took part in the Aunus expedition.

In 1928 Pajari married Kaija Björklund.

Second World War 
At the start of the Winter War, Lieutenant Colonel Pajari had JR 16 (Jalkaväkirykmentti 16) under his command. Pajari led the first Finnish successful mission in the Winter War by defeating the Soviet Union 139th Division in Battle of Tolvajärvi. He was promoted to colonel on 18 December 1939. In Tolvajärvi, Detachment  Pajari was part of Group Talvela. After Talvela moved to the Isthmus, Pajari became the commander of the group.

In the beginning of the Continuation War, Colonel Pajari commanded 18th division, which carried out a breakthrough in August 1941, of which Pajari was appointed on 14 September 1941 as the Knights of the Mannerheim Cross number 12. He was promoted to General Major on 3 October 1941. In 1942 he led the conquest of Suursaari. Pajari was moved to the 3rd The Division commander on 21 October 1943. During Soviet strategic Karelian offensive June 1944 Pajari commanded the 3rd division during major battles at two Finnish defensive lines (VT-asema, VKT-asema).

At the Lapland War General Major Pajari commanded 3rd division during conquest of Tornio (in northern Finland) from Nazi Germany in the beginning of October 1944. For this achievement, he was appointed as the Knights of Mannerheim Cross for the second time (one of the four double knights) on 16th October 1944.

Pajari's Boys 
Pajari had achieved a legendary reputation. He was a controversial and colourful personality who was criticized by many colleagues, but he was appreciated by his men. There was an exceptionally strong bond between Pajari and his men. Even during the war, men began to call themselves "the Sons of Pajari".

These sons included Finlayson's social director and member of parliament Eero Kivelä, Tampere Mayor Erkki Lindfors, and a teacher & the chairman of Tampere City Council, Lauri Santamäki. After the wars, Lindfors and Santamäki created the Tampere Arms Shaft, which had a major impact on the development of Tampere.

Death 
Pajari suffered from heart ailments and died of a heart attack on a business trip to Ostrobothnia in 1949. He is buried in the Kalevala Cemetery in Tampere. The memorial stone for Pajari, designed by Unto Ojonen, was erected in Asikkala 6 March 1977.

References 

 Niemi, Leena (2002) "Aaro Olavi Pajari (1897-1949) Vaikuttaja kaupungissa ja sotarintamalla" Koskesta Voimaa approx. translation of title "Aaro Olavi Pajari (1897-1949) in civil and military circumstances", with photo
This article is based in part on material from the Finnish Wikipedia.

1897 births
1949 deaths
People from Asikkala
People from Häme Province (Grand Duchy of Finland)
Finnish major generals
People of the Finnish Civil War (White side)
Finnish military personnel of World War II
Knights of the Mannerheim Cross